This is a list of foreign ministry headquarters.  It lists the names and locations of buildings that serve as the headquarters for foreign ministries.

References

Foreign ministry headquarters
Foreign ministry headquarters
 Headquarters
Foreign ministry headquarters
Foreign ministry
Foreign ministry headquarters
Lists of government buildings
Foreign ministry